Owen Moore (12 December 1886 – 9 June 1939) was an Irish-born American actor, appearing in more than 279 movies spanning from 1908 to 1937.

Early life and career
Moore was born in Fordstown Crossroads, County Meath, Ireland.  Along with his parents, John and Rose Anna Moore, brothers Tom, Matt, and Joe, and sister Mary, he emigrated to the United States as a steerage passenger on board the S.S. Anchoria.  The Moore family were inspected on Ellis Island in May 1896 and settled in the Toledo, Ohio area. Moore and his siblings went on to successful careers in motion pictures in Hollywood, California.

While working at D. W. Griffith's Biograph Studios, Moore met a young Canadian actress named Gladys Smith, whom he married on January 7, 1911. Their marriage was kept secret at first because of the strong opposition of her mother. However, Smith soon overshadowed her husband under her stage name, Mary Pickford. In 1912, he signed on with Victor Studios, co-starring in a number of their films with studio owner/actress Florence Lawrence.

Pickford left Biograph Studios to join the Independent Moving Pictures (IMP) to replace their star, Florence Lawrence. Carl Laemmle, the owner of IMP (IMP later merged into Universal Studios), agreed to sign Moore as part of the deal. This humiliation, together with his wife's meteoric rise to fame, drastically affected Moore, and alcohol became a problem that led to violent behavior and his physically abusing Pickford. In 1916, Pickford met actor Douglas Fairbanks.  In 1920, Pickford filed for divorce from Moore when she agreed to his demand of $100,000 settlement.  Pickford and Fairbanks married days later.

Moore appeared in many successful films for Lewis J. Selznick (father of producer David O. Selznick and agent Myron Selznick), in the late teens and early 1920s.  He was a popular star at Selznick Pictures along with Olive Thomas, Elaine Hammerstein, Eugene O'Brien and Conway Tearle. He also appeared in films for his own production company as well as Goldwyn and Triangle.

Moore married a second time to silent film actress, Katherine Perry, in 1921. With the advent of sound film, Moore's career declined, and he became a supporting actor for newer stars. He competed, as the third lead, with Cary Grant and Noah Beery, Sr. for the attentions of Mae West in She Done Him Wrong, Paramount's most lucrative film of 1933. His last film appearance was as a movie director in the 1937 drama A Star Is Born, starring Janet Gaynor and Fredric March – ironically a movie about a former film star who turned to alcohol, much like himself at that time.

Death
After years of fighting alcoholism, Moore was found dead on June 9, 1939, in his apartment in Beverly Hills, California. An Associated Press news report said that he "apparently had been dead two days". An autopsy was scheduled for the next day.

For his contribution to the motion picture industry, Moore has a star on the Hollywood Walk of Fame at 6727 Hollywood Boulevard.

Selected filmography

 The Guerrilla (1908, Short)
 The Valet's Wife (1908, Short)
 The Honor of Thieves (1909, Short) as Ned Grattan
 The Sacrifice (1909, Short)
 A Rural Elopement (1909, Short) as In Crowd
 The Criminal Hypnotist (1909, Short) as The Man
 The Welcome Burglar (1909, Short) as In Office / In Bar
 The Brahma Diamond (1909, Short)
 The Golden Louis (1909, Short) as The Good Samaritan 
 Trying to Get Arrested (1909, Short) as Passerby
 The Prussian Spy (1909, Short) as The Spy
 His Wife's Mother (1909, Short) as Restaurant Patron
 A Fool's Revenge (1909, Short) as The Duke
 The Roue's Heart (1909, Short) as Nobleman
 The Deception (1909, Short) as The Rich Patron
 A Burglar's Mistake (1909, Short) as At Folsom's
 Lady Helen's Escapade (1909, Short) as The Boyfriend
 Resurrection (1909, Short) as At Court / At Prison
 Two Memories (1909, Short) as Party Guest
 A Sound Sleeper (1909), Short) as  Police Officer
 Jones and the Lady Book Agent (1909, Short) as Office Employee 
 The Lonely Villa (1909, Short) as A Burglar
 The Little Darling (1909, Short) as In Boarding House
 The Hessian Renegades (1909, Short) as Colonial Army Messenger
 Leather Stocking (1909, Short) as Leather Stocking
 Pippa Passes (1909, Short) as Sibald
 Nursing a Viper (1909, Short) as Fleeing Aristocrat
 The Red Man's View (1909, Short) as Indian (uncredited)
 In Little Italy (1909, Short) as At the Ball
 To Save Her Soul (1909, Short) as At Party
 The Rocky Road (1910, Short)
 The Time-Lock Safe (1910, Short) as The Friend
 What the Daisy Said (1910, Short) (uncredited)
 In the Border States (1910, Short)
 Love in Quarantine (1910, Short)
 Their First Misunderstanding (1911, Short)
 Behind the Times (1911, Short) as Billy Thompson
 The Lesser Evil (1912, Short)
 The Angel of the Studio (1912, Short)
 So Runs the Way (1913, Short)
 Caprice (1913) as Jack Henderson
 The Battle of the Sexes (1914) as Cleo's lover
 Home, Sweet Home (1914) as The Tempter
 The Escape (1914) as Dr. von Eiden
 Aftermath (1914) as Allan Buchannan
 Cinderella (1914) as Prince Charming
 Mistress Nell (1915) as King Charles II
 Pretty Mrs. Smith (1915) as Mr. Smith No. 3, Frank
 Help Wanted (1915) as Jack Scott
 Betty in Search of a Thrill (1915) as Jim Denning
 Mabel Lost and Won (1915, Short) as Mabel's Sweetheart
 The Little Teacher (1915, Short) as Teacher's Fiancé
 Nearly a Lady (1915) as Jack Rawlins
 'Twas Ever Thus (1915) as Long Biceps / Frank Warren / Jack Rogers
 Jordan Is a Hard Road (1915) as Mark Sheldon
 Betty of Greystone (1916) as David Chandler
 Little Meena's Romance (1916) as The Count
 Susan Rocks the Boat (1916) as Larry O'Neil
 Under Cover (1916) as Steven Denby
 Rolling Stones (1916) as Dave Fulton
 Intolerance (1916) as Extra (uncredited)
 The Kiss (1916) as Jean-Marie
 A Coney Island Princess (1916) as Pete Milholland
 A Girl Like That (1917) as Jim Brooks
 The Little Boy Scout (1917) as Thomas Morton
 The Crimson Gardenia (1919) as Roland Van Dam
 Piccadilly Jim (1919) as James Braithwaite Crocker / Piccadilly Jim
 Sooner or Later (1920) as Patrick Murphy
 The Desperate Hero (1920) as Henry Baird
 The Poor Simp (1920) as Melville G. Carruthers
 The Chicken in the Case (1921) as Steve Perkins
 A Divorce of Convenience (1921) as Jim Blake
 Oh, Mabel Behave (1922) as Randolph Roanoke
 Reported Missing (1922) as Richard Boyd
 Love Is an Awful Thing (1922) as Anthony Churchill
 Modern Matrimony (1923) as Chester Waddington
 Hollywood (1923) as himself
 The Silent Partner (1923) as George Coburn
 Thundergate (1923) as Robert Wells / Kong Sur
 Her Temporary Husband (1923) as Thomas Burton
 Torment (1924) as Hansen
 East of Broadway (1924) as Peter Mullaney
 The Parasite (1925) as Arthur Randall
 Code of the West (1925) as Cal Thurman
 Go Straight (1925) as John Rhodes
 Camille of the Barbary Coast (1925) as Robert Morton
 False Pride (1925) as James Mason Ardsley
 The Blackbird (1926) as Bertram P. Glayde aka West End Bertie
 The Skyrocket (1926) as Mickey Reid
 Married ? (1926) as Dennis Shawn
 Money Talks (1926) as Sam Starling
 The Road to Mandalay (1926) as The Admiral
 The Red Mill (1927) as Dennis
 The Taxi Dancer (1927) as Lee Rogers
 Women Love Diamonds (1927) as Patrick Michael Regan
 Tea for Three (1927) as Philip Collamore
 Becky (1927) as Dan Scarlett
 Husbands for Rent (1927) as Herbert Willis
 The Actress (1928) as Tom Wrench
 Stolen Love (1928) as Curtis Barstow
 High Voltage (1929) as Det. Dan Egan
 Side Street (1929) as Dennis O'Farrell
 What a Widow! (1930) as Gerry Morgan
 Outside the Law (1930) as Harry 'Fingers' O'Dell
 Extravagance (1930) as Jim Hamilton
 Stout Hearts and Willing Hands (1931, Short) as Lookalike Bartender 1
 Hush Money (1931) as Steve Pelton
 As You Desire Me (1932) as Tony Boffie
 She Done Him Wrong (1933) as Chick Clark
 A Man of Sentiment (1933) as Stanley Colton
 A Star Is Born (1937) as Casey Burke - Director (final film role)

References

External links

kinotv.com

1886 births
1939 deaths
20th-century American male actors
20th-century Irish male actors
Actors from County Meath
American male film actors
American male silent film actors
Burials at Calvary Cemetery (Los Angeles)
Irish emigrants to the United States (before 1923)
Irish male film actors
Irish male silent film actors